The National Police Service Commission of Kenya is an Independent government Commission established under the Constitution of Kenya to ensure smooth functioning of the National Police Service of Kenya.

Roles
The commission's roles include:
 Recruit and appoint persons to hold or act in offices in the service, confirm appointments, and determine promotions
and transfers within the National Police Service
 Observing due process, exercise disciplinary control over and remove persons holding or acting in offices within the
Service

Membership 
The current membership of the Commission is as follows:
 Eliud Kinuthia (Chairman)
 Alice A. Otwala, CBS, MBS (Dr)
 Eusebius K. Laibuta, MBS, OGW,HSC, 'ndc'K
 Lillian Kimba, MBS, OGW
 John Ole Moyaki, MBS  
 Naphtaly K. Rono, MBS, HSC

See also
 Kenya Police

References

External links 
Official website

Politics of Kenya
Government agencies of Kenya
2012 in Kenya
Law of Kenya
Kenya articles by importance
Law enforcement in Kenya